The 2017 IMSA Prototype Challenge presented by Mazda is the twelfth season of the IMSA Lites series. The season features seven double header weekends.

Regulations
For the 2017 season the series had a make-over. The series name was changed from IMSA Lites to the IMSA Prototype Challenge. The classes were also changed. The L2 class was dropped after eleven seasons of service. The series was divided over two classes, LMP3 and MPC. The LMP3 class open to all LMP3 specification cars. Various chassis manufacturers have built LMP3 specification chassis. All chassis are equipped with a Nissan VK50VE, 5,0L, V8 engine. The MPC class is filled by Élan DP02, the former L1 class. All cars are shod with Continental tires.

Entry list

LMP3

Note: A driver with a (M) is participating in the Amateur Masters Category.

Mazda Prototype Challenge (MPC)

Note: All Élan DP02s are running with the Mazda MZR 2.0 L Engine.

Race calendar and results

Bold indicates overall winner.

Final standings

LMP3

Mazda Prototype Challenge

References

External links
 Official website

2017
2017 in American motorsport